Oregon Territory's at-large congressional district is an obsolete congressional district that encompassed the area of the Oregon Territory. In 1853, the northern half of the territory was reorganized into the Washington Territory.

After Oregon's admission to the Union as the 33rd state by act of Congress on February 14, 1859, this district was dissolved and replaced by Oregon's at-large congressional district. At the same time, the eastern portion of the territory was annexed to the Washington Territory.

List of delegates representing the district 
When the Oregon Territory was formed on August 14, 1848, Congress gave it the authority to elect a Congressional delegate, though the first delegate did not take his seat until 1849.

References

 

Former congressional districts of the United States
At-large United States congressional districts
Territory At-large
1848 establishments in Oregon Territory
1859 disestablishments in Oregon Territory